The 2018 Four Continents Figure Skating Championships were held in Taipei City, Taiwan on January 22–28, 2018.  Medals were awarded in men's singles, ladies' singles, pair skating, and ice dance.

Qualification 
This competition is open to skaters from all non-European member nations of the International Skating Union.  Skaters must have reached the age of 15 before July 1, 2017 to participate.  The corresponding competition for European skaters is the 2018 European Figure Skating Championships.

Each National Federation from the four represented regions are permitted to send up to three skaters/couples for each discipline. National Federations can select their entries based on their own criteria, as long as the selected skater/couples attains a minimum technical elements score (TES) at an international senior event prior to the Four Continents.

Minimum TES 
The ISU stipulates that the minimum scores must be achieved at an ISU-recognized senior international competition in the ongoing or preceding season, no later than 21 days before the first official practice day.

Entries 
Member nations began announcing their selections in December 2017.

Changes to initial assignments

Results

Men

Ladies

Pairs

Ice dance

Medals summary

Medalists 
Medals for overall placement:

Small medals for placement in the short segment:

Small medals for placement in the free segment:

Medals by country 
Table of medals for overall placement:

Table of small medals for placement in the short segment:

Table of small medals for placement in the free segment:

References

Citations 

2018
2018 in figure skating
2018 in Taiwanese sport
2018
January 2018 sports events in Asia